Kenneth Macpherson or McPherson (died after 1823) was a planter and slave-owner in Jamaica. He was elected to the House of Assembly of Jamaica in 1820.

References 

Members of the House of Assembly of Jamaica
Planters from the British West Indies
Scottish slave owners
Year of birth missing
Year of death missing
19th-century Jamaican people